Value and Context: The Nature of Moral and Political Knowledge is a 2006 book by Alan Thomas, in which the author discusses the debate between ‘cognitivists’ and ‘non-cognitivists’ about the possibility and the nature of moral knowledge.

References

External links 
 Value and Context: The Nature of Moral and Political Knowledge

2006 non-fiction books
2010 non-fiction books
Ethics books
Oxford University Press books
Works about John Rawls
Theses